Below is a list of notable people born in Bitola, North Macedonia or its surroundings:

 Toma Fila, lawyer and politician
 Theodoros Adam, chieftain of the Macedonian Struggle
 Slobodan Aligrudić, actor
 Mirjeta Bajramoska, handball player
 Julia Batino, antifascist and women's rights activist
 Hüseyin Avni Bey, lieutenant colonel
 Petros Christou, teacher and chieftain of the Macedonian Struggle
 Konstantin Čomu, started first cinema center together with the Manaki brothers
 Ajri Demirovski, folk music composer
 Slave Dimitrov, composer
 Igor Durlovski, opera singer
 Petar Džadžić, literary critic
 Naci Eldeniz, military officer in the Ottoman and Turkish armies
 Petar Georgiev-Kalica, composer and songwriter
 Karolina Gočeva, pop singer
 Gjoko Hadžievski, football coach
 Hafiz Hakki Pasha, Ottoman general 
 Nexhmije Hoxha, wife of Enver Hoxha
 Georgi Hristov, footballer
 Jonce Hristovski, folk singer
 Rafael Moshe Kamhi, member of the IMRO
 Janko Konstantinov, architect
 Mehmet Suphi Kula, Ottoman general 
 Kiril Makedonski, musician
 Miljan Miljanić, football coach
 Aleksandar Mladenović, linguist
 Georgios Modis, Greek jurist, politician, writer and participant in the Macedonian Struggle
 Dimitar Ilievski-Murato, alpinist, first Macedonian to climb Mount Everest
 Mirko Ivanovski, footballer
 Ahmed Izzet Pasha, Ottoman general
 Olga Jančić, sculptor
 Nikolče Noveski, footballer
 Tale Ognenovski, multi-instrumentalist
 Theofylaktos Papakonstantinou, Greek politician, journalist, minister of education and religious affairs
 Chris Petrovski, actor
 Pande Petrovski, Chief of Staff of the Army of the Republic of North Macedonia
 Mihail Petruševski, philologist and founder of the Faculty of Philosophy at Skopje University
 Gjerasim Qiriazi, founder of the Protestant Church of Albania
 Gjergj Qiriazi, writer
 Parashqevi Qiriazi, teacher of the first girls' Albanian school; participant of the Congress of Monastir
 Sevasti Qiriazi, pioneer of Albanian female education
 Dimitar Rizov, revolutionary and publicist
 Süleyman Sabri Pasha, Ottoman general
 Ljubica Sokić, painter
 Goran Stefanovski, dramatist and scriptwriter
 Archbishop Stephen, Head of the Macedonian Orthodox Church
 Georgi Sugarev, revolutionary
 Jovan Vraniškovski, Archbishop of the Orthodox Ohrid Archbishopric
 Tahsin Yazıcı, military officer and politician
 Hüseyin Avni Zaimler, Ottoman general
 Tajar Zavalani, journalist for the BBC
 Antonios Zois, Greek chieftain and Macedonian Fighter

List
Bitola